Exotic probability is a branch of probability theory that deals with probabilities which are outside the normal range of [0, 1]. 

According to the author of various papers on exotic probability, Saul Youssef, the valid possible alternatives for probability values are the real numbers, the complex numbers and the quaternions. Youssef also cites the work of Richard Feynman, P. A. M. Dirac, Stanley Gudder and S. K. Srinivasan as relevant to exotic probability theories.

Of the application of such theories to quantum mechanics, Bill Jefferys has said: "Such approaches are also not necessary and in my opinion they confuse more than they illuminate."

See also
 Negative probability
 Signed measure
 Complex measure

References

External links
 http://physics.bu.edu/~youssef/quantum/quantum_refs.html
 https://web.archive.org/web/20040327004613/http://fnalpubs.fnal.gov/library/colloq/colloqyoussef.html
 Measuring Negative Probabilities, Demystifying Schroedinger's Cat and Exploring Other Quantum Peculiarities With Trapped Atoms
 MathPages - The Complex Domain of Probability

Probability theory